The 1988–89 UCLA Bruins men's basketball team represented the University of California, Los Angeles in the 1988–89 NCAA Division I men's basketball season. Jim Harrick began his first year as head coach for the Bruins, being the 6th coach since the legendary John Wooden. The Bruins were ranked as high as 20th in the AP Poll during the season. The Bruins finished tied for third place in the Pac-10. They went on to the NCAA tournament where they advanced to the second round before losing to North Carolina 88-81.

Starting lineup

Roster

Schedule

|-
!colspan=9 style=|Regular Season

|-
!colspan=9 style=| Pac-10 Tournament

|-
!colspan=9 style=| NCAA tournament

Source

Notes
This was the second time UCLA had faced the North Carolina Tarheels in the NCAA Tournament. The previous encounter was in the 1968 Final Four Championship game (Los Angeles). The Bruins won out the first time, 78-55.

References

UCLA Bruins men's basketball seasons
Ucla
Ucla
NCAA
NCAA